Munder (also Munderbuiten) is a resort in Suriname, in the Paramaribo District. Its population at the 2012 census was 17,234.

References

Resorts of Suriname
Populated places in Paramaribo District